Tourmaline Plateau is an ice-covered plateau in the central part of the Deep Freeze Range, bounded by the Howard Peaks and the peaks and ridges which trend north-south from Mount Levick, in Victoria Land. It was so named by the Northern Party of the New Zealand Geological Survey Antarctic Expedition (NZGSAE), 1965–66, because of the quantities of tourmaline-granite found there.

Plateaus of Antarctica
Landforms of Victoria Land
Scott Coast